Eznis Airways LLC is a scheduled and charter airline based in Ulaanbaatar, Mongolia. It was once the largest domestic airline with services to a number of Mongolian domestic points and an international route to Hong Kong and Russia. It also had authorization for, but did not operate, international services to Kazakhstan. The airline initially ceased all operations in 2014, but in 2019 it restarted operations.  The company slogan is Fly easy, Fly smart! EZNIS Airways operates a fleet of Boeings that allow a greater efficiency in the maintenance and support of our low-cost airline model.

History 
In 2004, the Newcom Group, undertook feasibility research into starting up new domestic air transport services in Mongolia: in January 2006 they founded Eznis Airways, a wholly owned subsidiary. Eznis was granted Air Operator Certificate (AOC) No. 11 by the Mongolian Civil Aviation Authority (MCAA), and Eznis launched its inaugural service on December 6, 2006.

From 2005 to 2006, Eznis pilots were trained and type rated at Ansett Training Center in Australia, followed by line training supervised by former Japan Air Commuter captains. Qantas provided emergency training for the cabin crew while Saab Aircraft AB provided maintenance type rating training for maintenance staff. Crew attended CRM training by Boeing and dangerous goods training by IATA. GE and Hamilton provided engine and propeller line maintenance training for Eznis technicians. Eznis has full insurance coverage on its aircraft, spare parts and liabilities provided by AON in London. Eznis employs approximately 200 staff. 

In July 2008 Eznis Airways launched the Radixx computer reservation system: the airline intends to introduce Internet booking for tour operators, travel agencies and general public.

Eznis Airways has gained dominant position in the domestic air travel market of Mongolia and carried its 100,000th passenger in November 2008.

The airline began its first international regular services to Hailar, China in August 2009. In March 2010 Eznis Airways started operating flights to Hailar through Choibalsan in Dornod province of Mongolia. Launched in June 2010, Ulan-Ude, Russia was Eznis' second scheduled international destination.

Eznis Airways LLC ceased all operations from 22 May 2014 due to the financial difficulties and the current situation at the airline industry after restructuring measures failed during the last two years.

Eznis Airways, under a new ownership group, is to re-launch services in 2019, operating Boeing 737s on international routes. A Boeing 737-700 has already been acquired pending the airline's launch. Eznis Airways was relaunched in the second quarter of 2019.

Corporate affairs

The head office was located in the Shine Dul Building (Шинэ Дөл Билдинг) in Bayanzürkh, Ulan Bator. The head office moved there on 27 August 2011. With its main base located at Buyant-Ukhaa International Airport the airline sold tickets through the Central Ticketing Office in Ulaanbaatar, outstation branches in ten provinces of Mongolia, including Bayankhongor, Bayan-Ulgii, Dornod, Gobi-Altai, Khovd, Khuvsgul, Umnugobi, Uvs, Zavkhan as well as Hailar, China and Ulan-Ude, Russia. In the addition, the carrier's tickets can be bought at travel agencies: AirTrans, AirTicket, AirMarket, AirLink, MonAirTour, AirChamber, AirTravel and AviaComMongolia.

The airline's name “eznis” means ‘easiness in flight’. The name consists of two parts which when put together say 'easy flight': the first two letters “ez” stand for “easy” in English and “nis” is a Mongolian word meaning “fly”. The Eznis logo represents a compass with eight destinations.  A soft, flower-type image was chosen to give a relaxing and stress-free feeling to passengers.

Destinations 
Eznis Airways serves the following destinations:

Fleet 
  

, Eznis Airways operates the following aircraft:

In January 2009, the CEO of the airline Glen Pickard, stated that Eznis Airways signed a LoI with Bombardier Aerospace for the purchase of seven Bombardier CSeries aircraft, although this was never reported as official by Bombardier.

The airline made the decision to introduce jet aircraft in early 2011 and two Avro RJ85 aircraft (both ex Lufthansa Cityline airframes) joined the fleet. The first was delivered from the UK in June 2011 (registered as JU-9909) with the second arriving in September 2011 (JU-9915). The aircraft were primarily destined to be used on charter flying to mining sites in the Gobi desert and were modified for operations on gravel runways. Both Avros remain in service although only one is now dedicated to the Ulaanbaatar - Oyut Tolgoi route. The aircraft were also used on services to the west of the country (Khovd, Ulaangom and Ulgii) but reducing load factors and unrealistic fare structures made the routes uneconomic for the RJs to operate. Consequently, the airline now looked to the Bombardier Dash8-Q400 to restore its economic fortunes on its longer range domestic routes while the Avros continue to provide the lift capacity required by the mining companies. The Q400s had their Danish registration cancelled by 2015 (OY-YAG repainted and now operates as S2-AGW for US-Bangla Airlines).

The Boeing 737 venture was four-month exercise for the company. It was leased with a view to EZNIS opening international routes to Seoul, Beijing and Hong Kong. However, Eznis' access to international routes was denied thereby making the Boeing 737 project nonviable. Apart from operating a few charter flights, the aircraft never entered scheduled service.

Products and services

Onboard services
The airline publishes a quarterly in-flight magazine "Smartway", in Mongolian and English languages, featuring articles about Mongolian nature, history, culture and tradition. The airline also offers Mongolian daily newspapers on its flights, and it sells items with the company name and logo. The items can be purchased during flight or from the airline's Central Ticketing Office in Ulaanbaatar.

Frequent flyer program
Eznis Airways launched EZ FLYER, the airline's frequent flyer program, on January 15, 2009. The programs provides passengers with an opportunity to earn free or discounted flights by collecting corresponding points from each flight taken: the customer is required to collect boarding passes and tickets from scheduled flights and turn them in for reward redemption.

References

External links

 Official website
 https://web.archive.org/web/20110724041210/http://www.orientaviation.com/section.php?currenyIssue=I20090508140527-bLWq1&currentSection=commuter&currentArticle=A20090527150547-7M8dj&
 
 
 https://archive.today/20140522070331/http://www.flyeznis.com/statement

Airlines of Mongolia
Airlines established in 2006
Airlines disestablished in 2014
Airlines established in 2019
Companies based in Ulaanbaatar